Charlotte  was a sloop that sank in 1808 off the coast of New South Wales, Australia.

History
Charlotte was built in Sydney, Australia. and registered at 16 tons on 19 December 1803. Both Inch and Conway drowned.

References

Shipwrecks of the Northern Sydney Region
Ships built in New South Wales
History of New South Wales
Sloops of Australia
Individual sailing vessels
Grain ships
1803 ships
Maritime incidents in 1808
Shipwrecks of New South Wales
Ships lost with all hands
1808 in Australia
1788–1850 ships of Australia
Merchant ships of Australia